also known as Universal Benefit, Single Benefit, Core Benefit, Single Core Benefit 

With the general complexity of welfare systems, there are occasional requests for simplification of welfare systems.

The general aim is to head towards a simple system of benefits. This may also include a simplified system based on the individual rather than on identifiable groups reflecting the reasons for welfare assistance (e.g., unemployed, incapacity).

United Kingdom 
The British House of Commons Work and Pensions Committee has announced an inquiry to "examine the feasibility of simplifying the UK benefit system".

Particular areas of interest are likely to include:

 the consequences of historical benefit changes and reform on the current system
 the effectiveness of the Benefits Simplification Unit, progress of the Department for Work and Pensions Simplification Plan and implications of the Freud review
 international examples, where benefit systems have been reformed and/or developed to retain relative simplicity

New Zealand 
Also known as Working New Zealand

In the late 1980s Minister of Social Welfare Dr Michael Cullen announced the then Labour Government’s intention to move to a universal benefit. The Labour government subsequently lost the next election and the policy was dropped by the incoming National government.  

In 2001 the Labour-led government began its overhaul of social welfare with Pathways to Opportunity. Its aims were to:
 create a simpler system
 make work pay and investing in people
 support families and children
 ensure mutual responsibilities
 build partnerships
 tackle poverty and social exclusion

On October 26, 2006 the Labour-led government announced a number of changes to the welfare system. The changes include continuing to align rules and criteria of different benefits.

See also
 Basic income (UBI) 
 Social Policy

References

External links
Department for Work and Pensions website

New Zealand
Politics of New Zealand
Politics of the United Kingdom
Universal basic income in the United Kingdom